Sir Michael Joseph Keehan (born 31 March 1960), styled The Hon. Mr Justice Keehan, is a British judge of the High Court of Justice of the Courts of England and Wales.

Career
Keehan was called to the bar at Middle Temple in 1982. He was appointed a Queen's Counsel in 2000. He was appointed a Recorder in 2000 and was approved to sit as a deputy High Court judge. On 13 May 2013, he was appointed a High Court judge, assigned to the Family Division, receiving the customary knighthood in the 2013 Special Honours.

References

1960 births
Living people
Members of the Middle Temple
Family Division judges
Knights Bachelor